Dallas Oberholzer (born 27 June 1975) is a South African professional skateboarder.

He competed in the men's park event at the 2021 Tokyo Olympics and was the 2nd oldest competitor, in this event behind Rune Glifberg.

Biography 
Oberholzer started skateboarding in 1985. He graduated 1996 with a Bachelor's degree in Business/Commerce from the University of Natal, Pietermaritzburg.

References 

Living people
1975 births
South African skateboarders
Olympic skateboarders of South Africa
Skateboarders at the 2020 Summer Olympics
South African humanitarians
Sportspeople from Durban
University of Natal alumni